This article contains information about the literary events and publications of 1638.

Events
January 3 – Joost van den Vondel's historical play Gijsbrecht van Aemstel is first performed, to mark the opening of the Schouwburg of Van Campen, Amsterdam's first public theatre (postponed from 26 December 1637). It is then performed annually in the city on New Year's Day until 1968.
February 6 – Luminalia, a masque written by Sir William Davenant and designed by Inigo Jones, is staged at the English Court.
March 27 – The King's Men perform Chapman's tragedy Bussy D'Ambois at the English Court.
May – English poet John Milton sets out for a tour of the European continent. He spends the summer in Florence where he later claims to have met the incarcerated Galileo.
October 27 –  The King's Men act Ben Jonson's satirical city comedy Volpone (1606) at the Blackfriars Theatre in London.
unknown dates
An Armenian language edition of the Psalms printed in New Julfa (Isfahan) is the first book printed in Persia.
The Peking Gazette, official newspaper of the Ming Government in Beijing, makes a switch in its production process from woodblock printing to wooden movable type printing.
Swiss-born engraver Matthäus Merian produces his illustrated view of London.

New books

Prose
Maximilien de Béthune, duc de Sully – Mémoires ou Sages et Royales Oeconomies d'estat
Méric Casaubon – A Treatise of Use and Custom
Johann Amos Comenius – Janua Linguarum Reserata, or a Seed-Plot of All Languages and Sciences
Sir Kenelm Digby – A Conference With a Lady About a Choice of Religion
Robert Fludd – Philosophia Moysaica
Juan Rodriguez Freyle – El Carnero
Francis Godwin, Bishop of Hereford (died 1633; as Domingo Gonsales) – The Man in the Moone, or the Discovrse of a Voyage thither, an early example of science fiction
John Lilburne – A Work of the Beast
Philip Massinger – The Duke of Milan (second quarto)
John Pell – An Idea of Mathematicks
Francisco de Quevedo – De los remedios de cualquier fortuna
Captain John Underhill – News from America, or a New and Experimental Discovery of New England
John Wilkins – The Discovery of a World in the Moon

Drama
Richard Brome – The Antipodes
Antonio Coello – El conde de Sex, o Dar la vida por su dama
Pierre Corneille – Le Cid (first English translation)
Abraham Cowley – Naufragium Joculare (in Latin)
William Davenant
The Unfortunate Lovers
The Fair Favorite
Luminalia (masque)
Brittania Triumphans (masque)
John Ford
The Lady's Trial licensed
The Fancies Chaste and Noble published
Thomas Heywood – The Wise Woman of Hoxton published
Henry Killigrew – The Conspiracy published
John Kirke (?) or Wentworth Smith (?) – The Seven Champions of Christendom published
Tirso de Molina – Las Quinas de Portugal
Thomas Nabbes – The Bride
Thomas Randolph – Amyntas, or the Impossible Dowry published
William Rowley – A Shoemaker a Gentleman published
Pierre du Ryer – Alcione
James Shirley
The Royal Master performed and published
The Duke's Mistress published
Sir John Suckling – The Goblins
Lope de Vega – Porfiar hasta morir
Juan Pérez de Montalbán
Los amantes de Teruel
Tomo II de comedias

Poetry
John Barclay – The Mirror of Minds (posthumous)
Richard Braithwaite (alias "Corymbaeus") – Barnabee's Journal (In Latin and English versions)
William Davenant – Madagascar, with other Poems
Shackerley Marmion – A Funeral Sacrifice, to the Sacred Memory of his Thrice-Honored Father, Ben Jonson
John Milton – Lycidas

Births
January 1 – Nicolas Steno (Niels Steenson), Danish scientist (died 1686)
January 24 – Charles Sackville, 6th Earl of Dorset, English poet (died 1706)
May 13 – Richard Simon, French Biblical commentator (died 1712)
August 6 – Nicolas Malebranche, French philosopher (died 1715)
October – Edmé Boursault, French dramatist and miscellanist (died 1701)
probable – Hannah Allen, English Protestant writer (year of death unknown)

Deaths
January 27 – Gonzalo de Céspedes y Meneses, Spanish novelist (born c. 1585)
April 19 – Jeremias Drexel, German Jesuit religious writer (born 1581)
June 25 – Juan Pérez de Montalbán, Spanish dramatist, poet and novelist (born c. 1602)
December 8 – Ivan Gundulić, Croatian Baroque poet (born 1589)
c. December – John Day, English playwright and poet (born 1574)

References

 
Years of the 17th century in literature